Reuben Chitandika Kamanga (26 August 1929 – 20 September 1996) was a Zambian freedom fighter, politician and statesman.  He was educated at Munali Secondary School.

Early and family Life 
Kamanga was born on 2 August in 1929 in Chipata district of the Eastern Zambia at Chitandika village of chief Chinunda.

Political career 
Kamanga was imprisoned several times during the independence struggle  especially during the period 1959–60. In 1958 Kamanga along with other senior males from the Eastern Province joined the United National Independence party (UNIP). He later went to live in Cairo from 1960–62. Before Zambia's independence he served as the deputy president of the United National Independence Party and as Minister of Labour and Mines.

Following the attainment of independence on 24 October 1964, Kamanga was appointed and became Zambia's first Vice-President under President Kenneth Kaunda. As the country's first Vice President, Kamanga served for three years before Kenneth Kaunda changed him to serve in a different cabinet post. Thus, he was posted to Minister of Foreign Affairs in 1967, and then became Minister of Rural Development in 1969. He served in the Ministry of Agriculture as well. In 1983 Kamanga was appointed to the Central Committee in charge of Rural Development. RCK also served as Member of the Central Committee in charge of Legal & Political Affairs,  before his retirement in 1990.

Retirement from politics and death 
He retired from politics in 1991 before the political defeat of UNIP to the Movement for Multiparty Democracy (MMD). He left/retired with a few other colleagues who opted not to fight.  Kamanga later died on 20 September at his Makeni home in 1996. In October 2014, the extended Kamanga family wrote a letter to the Zambian Government asking them to rename the  Chipata District hospital after Ruben Kamanga, saying that he deserves to have something in his name for how influential he was during the fight for independence.

References

External links
Biographical sketch at El Corresponsal

1929 births
1996 deaths
People from Chipata District
Vice-presidents of Zambia
United National Independence Party politicians
Prisoners and detainees of Rhodesia
Zambian prisoners and detainees
Members of the Legislative Council of Northern Rhodesia
Members of the National Assembly of Zambia
Transport ministers of Zambia
Mines ministers of Zambia
Alumni of Munali Secondary School